Imja Glacier is located in the Himalayas, in the Solukhumbu District of Nepal. 

It originates on the western face of Kali Himal, and skirts the southern slopes of Imja Tse or Island Peak, south-east of Mount Everest. It is joined by the Lhotse Shar and Ambulapcha Glaciers. The glacier forms the eastern extent of Imja Tsho, which in turn drains through the Dingboche valley to the Imja Khola, Dudh Kosi, Ganges River and finally the Indian Ocean.

See also

List of glaciers in Asia

References

External links
 Everest glacier 'turning into a lake'

Glaciers of Nepal
Solukhumbu District